White Marsh is an unincorporated community and census-designated place in Baltimore County, Maryland, United States. The population was 9,513 at the 2010 census. White Marsh is a northeast suburb of Baltimore.

History 
In 1965, the largely undeveloped northeast corridor was identified by Baltimore County as the preferred site for intensive development. A town center was proposed to be located west of Belair Road at the planned intersection of White Marsh and Walther Boulevards.

The Harry T. Campbell Sons Corporation owned thousands of acres of land to the east of the planned town center, on both sides of Interstate 95. The land was bought in the 1930s and was being mined of its natural sand and gravel deposits. The Campbell family merged its sand and gravel business with an international building supply company. A new family-owned entity was charged with rejuvenating the family's property in northeast Baltimore County, which was covered with deep craters and pits.

In January 1943, the Cowenton Volunteer Fire Company was founded to counter the threat of incendiary bombings from the Axis Powers during the ongoing Second World War. The volunteer fire department, which was renamed the White Marsh Volunteer Fire Company in 2003, currently maintains a fire department and five vehicles, including two fire engines and an ambulance.

In the late 1960s, Nottingham Properties began analyzing the feasibility of a new town in White Marsh. From the first, the intent was to incorporate a variety of land uses and community services, including residential, retail, business, and industrial.

In 1969, a planning analysis of regional growth found development potential in the northeast brought about by the construction of I-95. The county was planning a series of arterial roads traveling in a northeasterly direction from Baltimore County that would pass through the Campbell land.

The plan was for a town center in an area created by a triangle of arterial roads. A mall would be at the center. The density of residential and business development would decline as it moved away from the mall. A residential sector was designated to the north, between Silver Spring Road and the planned White Marsh Boulevard. It would include all residential densities except high-rise. The area east of the town center to I-95 would be for office and research facilities. The Campbell land east of I-95 was slated for future industrial development.

Rezoning of the area was completed in 1970 and 1971. In 1979 the area was formally designated as a town center in the Baltimore County Master Plan.

From 1972 to 1981, the planning and development of the White Marsh Mall occurred, with the Rouse Company as owner and developer on land rented from Nottingham. In July 1973, Sears committed as an anchor store. In 1981, most stores opened. In 1992, Hecht's replaced Hutzler's. Next to the mall's property is the third IKEA store built in the United States, the oldest still remaining.

The General Motors Baltimore Transmission facility was built in White Marsh and operated from 2000 to 2019.

The White Marsh Library opened on January 25, 1988. It is part of the White Marsh Town Center, which includes the White Marsh Mall; the White Marsh Police Station, which opened in November 1987; the Nottingham Post Office, which opened in November 1990; and thousands of square feet of retail, industrial, and office space, which are still being developed.

Geography
White Marsh is located at  (39.383621, −76.458315).

Nearby suburbs include Perry Hall to the north, Rosedale to the southwest, Middle River to the south and Parkville to the west.

Demographics

As of the census of 2000, there were 8,485 people, 3,337 households, and 2,355 families residing in the CDP. The racial makeup of the CDP was 87.78% White, 4.28% African American, 0.32% Native American, 5.40% Asian, 0.04% Pacific Islander, 0.92% from other races, and 1.27% from two or more races. Hispanic or Latino of any race were 2.19% of the population.

There were 3,337 households, out of which 33.6% had children under the age of 18 living with them, 58.1% were married couples living together, 9.3% had a female householder with no husband present, and 29.4% were non-families. 22.1% of all households were made up of individuals, and 3.9% had someone living alone who was 65 years of age or older. The average household size was 2.54, and the average family size was 3.01.

In the CDP, the population was spread out, with 23.6% under the age of 18, 7.6% from 18 to 24, 34.2% from 25 to 44, 26.2% from 45 to 64, and 8.5% who were 65 years of age or older. The median age was 37 years. For every 100 females, there were 94.5 males. For every 100 females age 18 and over, there were 91.5 males.

The median income for a household in the CDP was $61,627, and the median income for a family was $70,600. Males had a median income of $46,171 versus $32,966 for females. The per capita income for the CDP was $26,317. About 3.1% of families and 2.7% of the population were below the poverty line, including 2.0% of those under age 18 and 7.9% of those age 65 or over.

References

 
Census-designated places in Maryland
Census-designated places in Baltimore County, Maryland
Planned cities in the United States